Betulia is a town and municipality in the Santander Department in northeastern Colombia.

Biodiversity
Frog Hypodactylus adercus is only known from Betulia, its type locality.

References

Municipalities of Santander Department